Neopontonides is a genus of shrimps belonging to the family Palaemonidae.

The species of this genus are found in Central America.

Species:

Neopontonides beaufortensis 
Neopontonides brucei 
Neopontonides chacei 
Neopontonides dentiger 
Neopontonides henryvonprahli

References

Palaemonidae